Aldington Frith is a village in Kent, England, south of Ashford.

Villages in Kent